The Rousters is an American adventure drama television series about a group of modern-day bounty hunters who are descendants of legendary lawman Wyatt Earp. It aired on NBC from October 1, 1983, until July 21, 1984. Despite advertising claims that this series would "sink The Love Boat" in the ratings, it was canceled in mid-season after only 6 of its 13 episodes had aired, with the remaining shows being burned off during the summer of 1984.

Premise
Wyatt Earp III (Chad Everett) works as a bouncer for the traveling Sladetown Carnival, run by "Cactus Jack" Slade (Hoyt Axton). Wyatt doesn't care for his embarrassing name or the legacy it represents, but his shotgun-toting mother Amanda (Maxine Stuart) wants to carry on the "family tradition" of keeping law and order through bounty hunting.

Wyatt's brother Evan (Jim Varney) has a penchant for con artistry and bungled repair-work; this character is mostly comic relief. Slade's lion-taming daughter Ellen (Mimi Rogers) is dating Wyatt and tutoring his teenage son Michael (Timothy Gibbs).

Cast
Chad Everett as Wyatt Earp III
Maxine Stuart as Amanda Earp
Hoyt Axton as "Cactus Jack" Slade
Mimi Rogers as Ellen Slade
Jim Varney as Evan Earp
Timothy Gibbs as Michael Earp

Episodes

References
 
 

1983 American television series debuts
1984 American television series endings
American action television series
Television series by 20th Century Fox Television
Television series by Stephen J. Cannell Productions
NBC original programming
English-language television shows
Television shows set in Kentucky